= Mount Barwell =

Mountain in Alberta, Canada

Coordinates: 50.78341°N 114.65201°W

Mount Barwell is a summit in Alberta, Canada.

Mount Barwell has the name of C. S. W. Barwell, a government surveyor.
